Trichloris crinita is a species of grass known by the common name false Rhodes grass. It is native to the Americas, where it occurs in the southwestern United States, northern Mexico, and parts of Argentina.

This perennial grass reaches up to 1 meter tall. It sometimes spreads via stolons. The rough-haired leaves are up to 20 centimeters long by 1 centimeter wide. The panicle is a cluster of up to 20 branches arranged in tight whorls. Each branch is up to 15 centimeters long and lined with tiny spikelets. Each spikelet has one bisexual and one or two sterile flowers.

This species is a common forage grass on dry plains in Argentina. In the US it is used for range revegetation.

References

Chloridoideae
Grasses of Mexico
Grasses of the United States
Grasses of Argentina
Flora of Arizona
Flora of Chihuahua (state)
Flora of New Mexico
Flora of Sonora
Native grasses of Texas